This is a list of metropolitan areas in Pakistan. These metropolitan areas are home to about 20% of the population or about 46 million Pakistanis.

Every Pakistani city with a population of 500,000 or more is considered a metropolitan area. This list is according to the 2017 Census of Pakistan. List

See also
Demography of Pakistan
List of most populous cities in Pakistan
List of metropolitan areas by population

References

Demographics of Pakistan
Cities in Pakistan
Pakistan
Metropolitan areas